Meterana asterope is a species of moth in the family Noctuidae. This species is endemic to New Zealand and is found in the North and South Islands. It inhabits both native forest and open habitat and adults emerge during the New Zealand summer. Adults are on the wing in December and January. This species is attracted to light and has also been collected via sugar traps.

Taxonomy 
This species was first described by George Hudson in 1898 using a female specimen collected in January at the tableland of Mount Arthur at 3600 ft and named Melanchra asterope. In 1928 Hudson discussed and illustrated this species under that name. In 1971 J. S. Dugdale discussed this species suggesting that it might belong within the Erana group. In 1988 J. S. Dugdale placed this species in the genus Meterana. The female holotype is held at Te Papa.

Description

Hudson described this species as follows:
This species is similar in appearance to Meterana dotata.

Distribution
This species is endemic to New Zealand and can be found in both the North and South Islands. It has been collected at locations such as its type locality of Mount Arthur, at Mount Richmond, Bold Peak in Otago, and at the Routeburn Valley.

Habitat 
This species inhabits native forest as well as more open habitat at altitudes of between 2500 and 4000 ft.

Behaviour
This species emerges in the New Zealand summer. Adults are on the wing between December and January and are attracted to light. They have also been collected via sugar traps.

References

Noctuinae
Moths of New Zealand
Endemic fauna of New Zealand
Moths described in 1898
Taxa named by George Hudson
Endemic moths of New Zealand